Discovery Home & Health is a television channel owned by Warner Bros. Discovery that features lifestyle programming.
Discovery Home & Health is available in Latin America, Australia, Republic of Ireland, Hong Kong, Philippines, Indonesia, Thailand and Malaysia.

It was formerly available on Australia's SelecTV from March 2007 until the closure of its English service in late 2007, but remained available through Foxtel and Austar. The channel was closed in Australia on 3 November 2014 and replaced with Discovery Kids, with select programming moving to sister channel TLC; Discovery Kids ceased operations on 1 February 2020.

Programming (Latin America)
From Head to Toe
I Didn't Know I Was Pregnant
I'm Pregnant and...
A Baby Story
A Wedding Story
Bridezillas
Newlywed, Nearly Dead?
One Week to Save Your Marriage
Say Yes to the Dress
Whose Wedding Is It Anyway?
Wife Swap UK 
Wife Swap US
Sister Wives
Strange Sex
Who the (Bleep) Did I Marry?
Tim Gunn's Guide to Style
What Not to Wear
10 Years Younger (US, Latin America)
Style Her Famous (also seen on E!)
How Do I Look?
What I Hate About Me
You're Wearing That?!?
Ultimate Shopper
Clean House
Dress My Nest
Divine Design
Emeril Green
Renovation Nation
Trading Spaces
Extreme Makeover: Home Edition
Extreme Weight Loss
Hoarding: Buried Alive
Jon & Kate Plus 8 / Kate Plus 8
Little People, Big World
Supernanny
World's Strictest Parents
17 Kids and Counting
Split Ends
The Biggest Loser
The Rachael Ray Show
Toddlers & Tiaras
Extreme Couponing
Mystery Diagnosis
Dating Naked (Brazil)

References

External links
Discovery Home & Health Latin America

Home Health
Warner Bros. Discovery networks
Television channels and stations established in 1998
Defunct television channels in Australia
English-language television stations in Australia

ms:Discovery Real Time